Cloak and Dagger is a 1946 spy film directed by Fritz Lang which stars Gary Cooper as an American scientist sent by the Office of Strategic Services (OSS) to contact European scientists working on the German nuclear weapons program and Lilli Palmer as a member of the Italian resistance movement who shelters and guides him. The story was drawn from the 1946 non-fiction book Cloak and Dagger: The Secret Story of O.S.S. by Corey Ford and Alastair MacBain, while a former OSS agent E. Michael Burke acted as technical advisor. Like 13 Rue Madeleine (1947), the film was intended as a tribute to Office of Strategic Services (OSS) operations in German-occupied Europe during World War II.

Plot
In 1944, a handsome bachelor and nuclear physicist named Alvah Jesper is working in the United States on the Manhattan Project to build a nuclear bomb. Recruited into the Office of Strategic Services, his mission is to make contact with a Hungarian nuclear physicist, Katerin Lodor, who has been working on the German project to make a nuclear bomb and has escaped into neutral Switzerland. Flown into Switzerland, Alvah finds it full of German agents who, after he manages one brief conversation with Katerin, abduct her. By befriending and then blackmailing Ann Dawson, an attractive American now a German agent, he discovers where Katerin is being held, but an OSS raid on the building fails and she is shot dead.

In the conversation, Katerin had said that the Germans wanted her to work with an Italian nuclear physicist named Polda. The OSS land Alvah in Italy from a British submarine and he is hidden by an attractive member of the Resistance, Gina. He manages to obtain a brief conversation with Polda, who agrees to work with the Americans only if the OSS first frees his daughter Maria, who is being held by the Germans. The OSS raid on the building is successful and in an isolated safe house they deliver Maria to her father. He is horrified, because the woman is not his daughter but a German agent, who says the house is surrounded by German troops. In the ensuing gun battle, Alvah and Gina smuggle Polda out through a tunnel from the house to a nearby well and struggle across country to a rendezvous with a British aircraft which will fly them out. Polda and Alvah board it safely; although there is room for her, Gina says she must stay behind to free her country from the Germans and begs Alvah to come back for her when the war is over.

Cast
 Gary Cooper as Professor Alvah Jesper
 Robert Alda as Pinkie
 Lilli Palmer as Gina
 Vladimir Sokoloff as Polda
 J. Edward Bromberg as Trenk
 Marjorie Hoshelle as Ann Dawson
 Ludwig Stössel as The German
 Helene Thimig as Katerin Lodor
 Dan Seymour as Marsoli
 Marc Lawrence as Luigi
 James Flavin as Colonel Walsh
 Patrick O'Moore as The Englishman
 Charles Marsh as Erich

Missing final reel
As planned by Lang, the film had a different ending. Jesper (Cooper) leads a group of American paratroopers into Germany to discover the remains of an underground factory, the bodies of dead concentration camp workers, and evidence the factory was working on nuclear weapons.

Jesper remarks that the factory may have been relocated to Spain or Argentina and launched a diatribe saying: "This is the Year One of the Atomic Age and God help us if we think we can keep this secret from the World!"

Producer Milton Sperling, who had frequently quarreled with Lang on the set, thought the final scene ridiculous, since the audience knew the Germans had no nuclear capacity. The film's screenwriters Lardner and Maltz became two of the Hollywood Ten, accused of adding communist dogma to movie scripts such as this one. Writing a script saying the US could not keep nuclear secrets from the USSR, such as in this film, was one of many accusations against the Ten.

Radio show
A 1950 NBC radio show of the same title based on Ford and MacBain's book lasted 26 episodes.  Cloak and Dagger began with actor Raymond Edward Johnson asking "Are you willing to undertake a dangerous mission for the United States knowing in advance you may never return alive?"

Box-office
According to Warner Bros., records the film earned $2,580,000 domestically and $1,828,000 abroad.

See also

Cloak and dagger, the English language idiom

Notes

External links

DVD Savant remarks on missing scenes
Cloak and Dagger on Lux Radio Theater: May 3, 1948

1946 films
1940s spy films
American spy films
American black-and-white films
Films directed by Fritz Lang
Films scored by Max Steiner
Warner Bros. films
World War II spy films
Films with screenplays by Ring Lardner Jr.
Films about nuclear war and weapons
Films set in Switzerland
Films set in Italy
Cultural depictions of J. Robert Oppenheimer
1940s English-language films
1940s American films
Films about Italian resistance movement